The Edinburg Roadrunners were a professional baseball team based in Edinburg, Texas, in the United States. The Roadrunners were a member of the United League Baseball, an independent professional league which is not affiliated with Major League Baseball or Minor League Baseball.  They played in United League Baseball from 2006 to 2010 and the North American League from 2011 to 2012. They played their home games at Edinburg Stadium. The city refused to extend a lease for the 2014 season and with nowhere to play the team shut down.

History
The Edinburg Roadrunners started play in the Texas–Louisiana League in 2001, an independent baseball league not affiliated with Major League Baseball or Minor League Baseball. All games were played at Edinburg Stadium. They won the league title that year, which was the last before a rebranding led to the league being known as the Central Baseball League. They won the 2004 title in a sweep. The league disbanded in 2005, with half of the teams (Fort Worth Cats, Shreveport-Bossier Sports, Pensacola Pelicans, Coastal Bend Aviators, and El Paso Diablos) electing to join the American Association of Professional Baseball while the other half (Alexandria Aces, Amarillo Dillas, Laredo Broncos, Rio Grande Valley WhiteWings and San Angelo Colts) joined to make United League Baseball. However, the Roadrunners had folded prior to the league closing. In its place would be a new team in Edinburg christened the Edinburg Coyotes.The Coyotes began their existence by winning a historic 17 games without a loss, a minor league record, completing over 5 series before finally losing to the San Angelo Colts.  The Coyotes went on to win the inaugural United League regular season title before losing to the Alexandria Aces in the league championship.  After spending its first three seasons as the Coyotes, United League Baseball at a press conference on April 30, 2009 announced the franchise would become the Edinburg Roadrunners, named after the prior popular ball club, including its team logo and mascot.

The Roadrunners played 2009 and 2010 in the ULB before moving on to the North American League in 2011, where they played two seasons. They played one final season in 2013 with the United League. In their final season (consisting of a six-team league that saw two teams fold), they won the championship.

Season-by-season record

All-Stars

Players
2006
 Evan Cherry, OF
 Robinson Cancel, C
 Neomar Flores, RHP
 Eric Montoya, RHP
 Jose Olmeda, 1B
 Edwar Ramírez, RHP
 Larry Martin Jr., LHP
 Julio Ruiz, RHP

2007
 Julio Castro, RHP
 Luis Espinosa, C
 Eric Gonzalez, 2B
 Aaron Guerra, RHP
 Rodney Medina, OF
 Bric Steed, LHP
 Nelson Teilon, SS

2008
 Julio Castro, RHP
 Jarvis Abram, OF

Major League players
 Edwar Ramírez, RHP – New York Yankees, Oakland Athletics
Robinson Cancel, C – Milwaukee Brewers, New York Mets, Houston Astros

Managers

Chad Tredaway (2001–04)
Vince Moore (2004–05)
Steve Maddock (2011)

All-Stars

2001
 Scott Fowler, RHP (Rookie of the Year)
 Sergio Guerrero, 2B
 Ryan Harris, RHP
 Chad Tredaway, Manager (Manager of the Year)

2002
 Pedro Cervantes, RP
 Scott Green, RHP
 Steve Shirley, 3B (Rookie of the Year)
 Chad Tredaway, Manager (Manager of the Year)

2003
 Ryan Harris, RHP

2004
 Anthony Angel, 2B
 Pedro Flores, LHP
 Ryan Harris, RHP
 Ryan Lehr, IF
 Eric Montoya, RHP
 Ryan Webb, OF

2005
 Matt Spencer, OF
 Steve Wilkerson, P

Major League players

Randy Williams – LHP with Seattle Mariners (2004), San Diego Padres (2005), Colorado Rockies (2005)

Connections with current Edinburg Roadrunners

Connections between the original and current Edinburg Roadrunners include the same name, logo, colors, mascot Rowdy the Roadrunner, manager Vince Moore, CBL/ULB All-Star Eric Gonzalez, Pitcher Pedro Flores, and playing at Edinburg Baseball Stadium.  The Rio Grande Valley WhiteWings have been a rival of both teams.

References

Notes

External links

North American League teams
United League Baseball teams
Professional baseball teams in Texas
Edinburg, Texas
Sports in the Rio Grande Valley
2001 establishments in Texas
2013 disestablishments in Texas
Baseball teams established in 2001
Baseball teams disestablished in 2013
Defunct independent baseball league teams
Defunct baseball teams in Texas